Slate River may refer to:
Slate River (Ireland)
 Slate River, New Zealand, a stream in New Zealand
Two streams in the U.S. state of Michigan:
 Slate River (Baraga County, Michigan)
 Slate River (Gogebic County, Michigan) 
 Slate River (Colorado), a stream in the US state of Colorado
 Slate River (Virginia), a stream in the US state of Virginia